Isaac Portillo (born 8 November 1994) is a Salvadoran professional footballer who plays as a midfielder for Primera División club Alianza.

He made his debut for the senior El Salvador national team against Grenada on 26 March 2021.

References

External links
 
 

Living people
1994 births
Salvadoran footballers
El Salvador international footballers
Association football midfielders
Alianza F.C. footballers
Salvadoran Primera División players
People from San Salvador Department
2021 CONCACAF Gold Cup players